John Crossan may refer to:

 Johnny Crossan (born 1938), Northern Irish footballer
 John Dominic Crossan (born 1934), Irish-American religious scholar